Colter Canyon is located in Grand Teton National Park, in the U. S. state of Wyoming. The canyon was formed by glaciers which retreated at the end of the last glacial maximum approximately 15,000 years ago, leaving behind a U-shaped valley. Colter  Canyon is north of Ranger Peak and the entrance to the canyon is along the northwestern shore of Jackson Lake.

See also
Canyons of the Teton Range
Geology of the Grand Teton area

References

Canyons and gorges of Grand Teton National Park
Canyons and gorges of Wyoming